Eliza Rocks is a chain of rocks lying between Desolation Island and Zed Islands off the north coast of Livingston Island in the South Shetland Islands, Antarctica and extending 1 km in west-northwest direction.  The area was visited by early 19th century sealers operating from Blythe Bay, Desolation Island.

The feature is named after the British sealing ship Eliza under Captain John Wright that was moored in Blythe Bay during part of the 1821–22 season.

Location

See also 
 Composite Antarctic Gazetteer
 List of Antarctic islands south of 60° S
 SCAR
 Territorial claims in Antarctica

Maps
 L.L. Ivanov. Antarctica: Livingston Island and Greenwich, Robert, Snow and Smith Islands. Scale 1:120000 topographic map.  Troyan: Manfred Wörner Foundation, 2009.

External links
Eliza Rocks. Composite Antarctic Gazetteer.

Rock formations of the South Shetland Islands